The Telluride Daily Planet is a local newspaper published in Telluride, Colorado which covers news and events in the Telluride area. It is published three days a week, on Sunday, Wednesday and Friday. According to the masthead, it has been publishing since 1898 and has incorporated two other newspapers, the Telluride Times and the Telluride Journal. 

In 1998, the Daily Planet was sold by its local ownership to Texas-based American Consolidated Media. In 2001, ACM sold its Colorado papers to Womack Publishing. In 2005, Womack sold the papers to GateHouse Media. This newspaper is owned by Thirteenth Street Media, who bought the paper from GateHouse in 2008, and has a circulation of about 5,000 copies.

References

External links
 Telluride Daily Planet website.

See also
 Twin Cities Daily Planet
 Daily Planet (Philadelphia newspaper)
 Berkeley Daily Planet
 Asheville Daily Planet
 Daily Planet DC

Newspapers published in Colorado
Telluride, Colorado